Martin Walti (born 9 January 1982) is a Swiss freestyle skier. He competed in the men's aerials event at the 2002 Winter Olympics.

References

External links
 

1982 births
Living people
Swiss male freestyle skiers
Olympic freestyle skiers of Switzerland
Freestyle skiers at the 2002 Winter Olympics
People from Schlieren, Switzerland
Sportspeople from the canton of Zürich
21st-century Swiss people